Yan Giroux is a Canadian film director and screenwriter. He won the Prix Iris for Best Screenplay, and was a nominee for Best Director, for his film For Those Who Don't Read Me (À tous ceux qui ne me lisent pas) at the 21st Quebec Cinema Awards in 2019.

He previously directed the short films Il faut que je parle à mon père (2007), Juste deux minutes (2010), Surveillant (2012), Mi nina mi vida (2014) and Lost Paradise Lost (2017), the documentary films Cubanos: Life and Death of a Revolution (2007), Elegant (2009) and Français: Un 14 juillet à Marseille (2011), and music videos for Malajube.

References

External links

21st-century Canadian screenwriters
Canadian screenwriters in French
Film directors from Quebec
Canadian documentary film directors
French Quebecers
Writers from Quebec
Living people
Canadian music video directors
Year of birth missing (living people)